The Natural Law Party of Quebec fielded 102 candidates in the 1994 provincial election, none of whom were elected. This page has information about these candidates.

Electoral divisions

Fabre: Christian Rouvière
Christian Rouvière received 259 votes (0.65%), finishing fifth against Parti Québécois candidate Joseph Facal.

Labelle: Michel Turbide
Michel Turbide has a bachelor's degree in business administration. He was a chef for ten years and has long been active in the transcendental meditation movement. Turbide has written a book on aromatherapy and gives regular presentations on the subject. He received 340 votes (1.27%) in the 1994 election, finishing fourth against Parti Québécois incumbent Jacques Léonard.

Mercier: Marylise Baux
Marylise Baux was a Natural Law Party candidate at both the federal and provincial levels in the 1990s. She identified as a marketing agent in 1993.

Nicolet-Yamaska: Jacques Houde
Jacques Houde received 840 votes (3.14%), finishing third against Parti Québécois candidate Michel Morin.

References

Candidates in Quebec provincial elections
Quebec 1994